The 2022–23 Michigan Wolverines women's basketball team represented the University of Michigan during the 2022–23 NCAA Division I women's basketball season. The Wolverines were by head coach Kim Barnes Arico in her eleventh year, and played their home games at the Crisler Center. This season marked the program's 41st season as a member of the Big Ten Conference.

Previous season
The Wolverines finished the 2021–22 season with a 25–7 record, including 13–4 in Big Ten play to finish in third place. They also reached No. 4 in the AP Poll, their highest rank ever, and were ranked the No. 3 seed in the 2022 NCAA tournament, their highest seed ever. The Wolverines advanced to the Elite Eight for the first time in program history.

Offseason
On April 5, 2022, former assistant coach Carrie Moore was named the head coach for Harvard, following the retirement of longtime head coach Kathy Delaney-Smith.

Roster

Schedule and results

|-
! colspan="9" style="background:#00274C; color:#FFCB05;"| Exhibition

|-
! colspan="9" style="background:#00274C; color:#FFCB05;"| Regular season

|-
! colspan="9" style="background:#242961; color:#F7BE05;"| Big Ten Women's Tournament

|-
! colspan="9" style="background:#242961; color:#F7BE05;"| NCAA Women's Tournament

Rankings

References

Michigan
Michigan
Michigan
Michigan Wolverines women's basketball seasons
Michigan